Elizabeth (Liz) Snyder (born October 1980)  is an American Democratic politician. She was elected to the Alaska House of Representatives in the 2020 election to represent the 27th district, defeating Minority Leader of the House Lance Pruitt. She didn't run for re-election in 2022.

Personal life 
She is married to Sam Snyder. They are living in East Anchorage with their two sons.

Electoral history

References

External links
 Liz Snyder at Ballotpedia
Liz Snyder - The Alaska State Legislature Biography
Liz Snyder Official website

Living people
Democratic Party members of the Alaska House of Representatives
21st-century American politicians
21st-century American women politicians
Women state legislators in Alaska
Emory University alumni
University of Florida alumni
University of Alaska Anchorage faculty
American women academics
1980 births